Jorge Luis Pinto Afanador (born 16 December 1952) is a Colombian football manager. He is the current manager of Categoría Primera A club Deportivo Cali.

Managing career
Pinto managed several teams in Colombia, including Santa Fe and Unión Magdalena on two occasions, before joining Club Alianza Lima (Peru) in 1997. The team was able to win the 1997 Torneo Descentralizado, after an 18-year drought. Afterwards, he left the club and returned to Colombia.

After an unsuccessful attempt at coaching Costa Rica in 2004–2005, Pinto returned to Colombia to coach a recently promoted team Corporación Nuevo Cúcuta Deportivo which he led to win their first Colombian National Championship in their history.

He was later named as the new coach of the Colombia national football team. His job was highly criticized by the general public after very bad showings against Uruguay and Chile in 2010 World Cup Qualifying matches as well as in the 2007 Copa América. Jorge Luis Pinto took Colombia to one of the best starts in FIFA World Cup Qualifying in Colombian football history, obtaining 10 points out of a possible 16. However, due to several lackluster performances later on, Colombia ended in 7th place and failed to qualify for the 2010 FIFA World Cup.

In 2011, he became manager of Costa Rica again, and on 10 September 2013 qualified for the 2014 FIFA World Cup in Brazil. Costa Rica ended in second place in 2014 World Cup qualification. He was voted as CONCACAF's best coach of 2014 after the World Cup, beating United States head coach Jürgen Klinsmann.

In the 2014 FIFA World Cup, Pinto secured a 3–1 victory for Costa Rica over Uruguay and another 1–0 victory over Italy. After a 0–0 draw against England, Costa Rica finished first in what many called the "Group of Death", the second time Costa Rica made it to the World Cup Round of 16. On 29 June 2014, Costa Rica defeated Greece on penalties and went through to the quarter finals of the 2014 World Cup. His team eventually lost on penalties to the Netherlands after a goalless draw.

In December 2014, he became manager of the Honduras. Pinto took his team into the two leg intercontinental playoff against Australia for a place at the 2018 FIFA World Cup in Russia. However, Honduras lost to Australia 3–1 on aggregate over the two legs and Pinto later stepped down as Honduras coach.

In July 2018, he was on a 4-man shortlist for the vacant Egyptian national team manager job. In November 2018, he returned to Colombia to coach Millonarios, until October 2019.

In summer 2020, he became the head coach of the United Arab Emirates national team. On 30 November 2020, Pinto's contract was terminated due to disappointing results with the national team.

On 1 October 2022, he returned to Deportivo Cali for a second spell as manager, having previously been at the helm of the Colombian club from 1990 to 1991.

Managerial statistics

Managerial honours
Alianza Lima
 Peruvian Primera División Champion: 1997
 Peruvian Primera División Clausura Champion: 1999

Alajuelense
 Costa Rican Primera División Apertura Champion: 2002
 Costa Rican Primera División  Apertura and Clausura Champion: 2003

Cúcuta Deportivo
 Categoría Primera A: 2006

Deportivo Táchira
 Venezuelan Primera División: 2010–11

Costa Rica national team
 Copa Centroamericana: 2005, 2013

Honduras national team
 Copa Centroamericana: 2017

Individual
CONCACAF's 2014 coach of the year
Best Colombian coach of 2014

References

External links
 Official Website 

1952 births
Living people
Club Alianza Lima managers
Atlético Junior managers
Colombian football managers
Colombia national football team managers
Deportivo Cali managers
Independiente Santa Fe managers
Millonarios F.C. managers
L.D. Alajuelense managers
2004 Copa América managers
2007 Copa América managers
2014 FIFA World Cup managers
Costa Rica national football team managers
Honduras national football team managers
United Arab Emirates national football team managers
Expatriate football managers in Venezuela
Expatriate football managers in Costa Rica
Expatriate football managers in Ecuador
Expatriate football managers in Peru
Expatriate football managers in Honduras
Expatriate football managers in the United Arab Emirates
Cúcuta Deportivo managers
Deportivo Táchira F.C. managers
2017 CONCACAF Gold Cup managers
2015 CONCACAF Gold Cup managers
Colombian expatriate football managers